Marcus Victor Jan Nyman (born 14 August 1990) is a Swedish judoka. He competes in the men's −90 kg judo event. In the 2012 Summer Olympics he was eliminated after losing his first match. In the 2016 Summer Olympics he won three of five matches and finished fifth. Nyman won the gold medal at the 2010 European Judo Championships and the bronze medal at the 2011 and 2016 Championships.

References

External links
 
 
 

Swedish male judoka
1990 births
Living people
Olympic judoka of Sweden
Judoka at the 2012 Summer Olympics
Judoka at the 2016 Summer Olympics
European Games competitors for Sweden
Judoka at the 2015 European Games
Judoka at the 2020 Summer Olympics
21st-century Swedish people